Harry Torczyner may refer to:
 Naftali Herz Tur-Sinai  (1886 - 1973), an Israeli biblical researcher
 , (1910 – 1998), an American lawyer and art critic